Argyroxiphium is a small genus of plants in the family Asteraceae. Its members are known by the common names silversword or greensword due to their long, narrow leaves and the silvery hairs on some species. The silverswords belong to a larger radiation of over 50 species, including the physically different genera Dubautia and Wilkesia. This grouping is often referred to as the silversword alliance. Botanist P. H. Raven referred to this radiation as "the best example of adaptive radiation in plants".

Description 

Species in Argyroxiphium are perennial, rosette-forming shrubs.  They may consist of a single large rosette or a collection of several rosettes. In all Argyroxiphium species, long, narrow leaves contain interstitial gels hypothesized to function as water storage.  For some species, leaves are covered with trichomes that provide protection from frost and create the plants' signature silver sheen.

A silversword rosette grows for at least five years before flowering, though some species grow for up to 90 years before initiating the bolting process. For monocarpic individuals with a single rosette, this ends in the death of the plant, though some individuals are polycarpic. The corollae vary in color from wine red to yellow or white. Because they are self-incompatible and require cross-pollination by insects, many plants must flower at the same time in relatively close proximity to set seed. A significant population must exist for enough individuals to flower simultaneously and allow pollination to occur. The single-seeded fruits are usually dispersed by wind.

Despite their different appearances, silverswords are very closely related to the genus Dubautia.  Sympatric species in Argyroxiphium and Dubautia often naturally produce fertile hybrids that run the gamut of morphological characteristics from the two genera.  Together, Argyroxiphium, Dubautia, and Wilkesia make up the silversword alliance.

Evolution 

The evolutionary roots of Argyroxiphium are the tarweeds in subtribe Madiinae.  DNA analysis has revealed that silverswords form a clade within the Californian tarweed lineage.  The relation is also physically evident—silversword capitulae and the flowers of Californian tarweeds both include sticky bracts that provide adhesion to birds for seed dispersal.  It is hypothesized that an individual plant from the Californian tarweeds was spread first to Kauai, then spread to the other islands and developed into the silversword alliance.

Distribution 

Silverswords are endemic to Hawaii and occur only on the islands of Maui and Hawaii. The Haleakalā silversword (A sandwicense ssp. macrocephalum) is constrained to Haleakalā on Maui while the Mauna Kea silversword (A. sandwicense ssp. sandwicense) is specific to Mauna Kea on Hawaii. Each of the other species is found primarily at lower altitudes with much higher annual rainfall.

Conservation 

The Mauna Loa or Kaū silversword (A. kauense) has been classified as critically endangered and the Mauna Kea and Halekalā silverswords (A. sandwichense) have been classified as endangered in the IUCN Red List.  Direct damage from humans and from ungulate browsing have significantly damaged silversword populations, but dedicated management efforts have resulted in successful conservation of some species.  In particular, the Haleakalā silversword population reached a low of approximately 4,000 plants in the 1920s, but rebounded to over 6,500 individuals by 1970.  On the other hand, the Mauna Kea silversword population was composed of approximately 50 naturally occurring individuals and 500 outplanted individuals in 1999.  The East Maui greensword (A. virescens) is apparently extinct, but in 1989 plants were discovered that appear to be hybrids between it and the Haleakalā silversword.

Species 

Accepted species
Argyroxiphium caliginis C.N.Forbes – Eke silversword
Argyroxiphium grayanum (Hillebr.) O. Deg. – greensword
Argyroxiphium × kai D.D.Keck (A. caliginis × A. grayanum)
Argyroxiphium kauense (Rock & M.Neal) O.Deg. & I.Deg. – Mauna Loa or Kaū silversword
Argyroxiphium sandwicense DC. – silversword
Argyroxiphium sandwicense subsp. sandwicense DC. – Mauna Kea silversword
Argyroxiphium sandwicense subsp. macrocephalum (A.Gray) Meyrat – Haleakalā silversword
Argyroxiphium virescens Hillebr. – East Maui greensword (extinct)

Formerly included
now in Wilkesia 
A. gymnoxiphium - Wilkesia gymnoxiphium

Gallery

References

External links

Kaʻahele Hawaiʻi Native Plants
Hawaiian silversword alliance, University of Hawaii Botany
US Department of Agriculture plants profile

 
Endemic flora of Hawaii
Asteraceae genera